Martina Navratilova defeated the defending champion Chris Evert in the final, 6–1, 6–3 to win the women's singles tennis title at the 1983 US Open. With the win, she completed the career Grand Slam in singles. It was her first US Open singles title and seventh major singles title overall.

Seeds
The seeded players are listed below. Martina Navratilova is the champion; others show the round in which they were eliminated.

  Martina Navratilova (champion)
  Chris Evert (finalist)
  Andrea Jaeger (quarterfinalist)
  Tracy Austin (withdrew)
  Pam Shriver (semifinalist)
  Wendy Turnbull (third round)
  Sylvia Hanika (quarterfinalist)
  Hana Mandlíková (quarterfinalist)
  Andrea Temesvári (third round)
  Zina Garrison (fourth round)
  Barbara Potter (second round)
  Kathy Rinaldi (second round)
  Claudia Kohde-Kilsch (second round)
  Jo Durie (semifinalist)
  Virginia Ruzici (first round)
  Kathy Jordan (fourth round)

Qualifying

Draw

Final eight

Earlier rounds

Section 1

Section 2

Section 3

Section 4

Section 5

Section 6

Section 7

Section 8

See also
 Evert–Navratilova rivalry

External links
1983 US Open – Women's draws and results at the International Tennis Federation

Women's Singles
US Open (tennis) by year – Women's singles
1983 in women's tennis
1983 in American women's sports